Luis Alberto Ramos (born October 2, 1953 in Mendoza, Argentina) is a former Argentine footballer who played for clubs of Argentina and Chile.

Teams
 Huracán Las Heras 1966-1970
 Rosario Puerto Belgrano 1970-1974
 Atlanta 1975-1976
 Universidad de Chile 1976
 Colo-Colo 1977
 Green Cross Temuco 1978
 Universidad de Chile 1979-1980
 Regional Atacama 1981-1982
 Everton 1983-1984
 Rangers 1987
 Unión Española 1987

Titles
 Universidad de Chile 1979 (Copa Chile)

Honours
 Universidad de Chile 1979 (Top Scorer Copa Chile)

External links
 

1953 births
Living people
Argentine footballers
Argentine expatriate footballers
Club Atlético Atlanta footballers
Colo-Colo footballers
Deportes Temuco footballers
Universidad de Chile footballers
Chilean Primera División players
Argentine Primera División players
Expatriate footballers in Chile
Association football forwards
Sportspeople from Mendoza, Argentina